Roper v. Simmons, 543 U.S. 551 (2005), was a landmark decision in which the Supreme Court of the United States held that it is unconstitutional to impose capital punishment for crimes committed while under the age of 18. The 5–4 decision overruled Stanford v. Kentucky, in which the court had upheld execution of offenders at or above age 16, and overturned statutes in 25 states.

Background 

In 1993, in the state of Missouri, 17-year-old Christopher Simmons, along with two younger friends, Charles Benjamin and John Tessmer, concocted a plan to murder Shirley Crook. The plan was to commit burglary and murder by breaking and entering, tying up a victim. The three met in the middle of the night; however, Tessmer dropped out of the plot. Simmons and Benjamin broke into Mrs. Crook's home, bound her hands and covered her eyes. They drove her to a state park and threw her off a bridge. Later she was found dead by drowning; she was 46 years of age.

Once the case was brought to trial, the evidence was overwhelming. Simmons had confessed to the murder, performed a videotaped reenactment at the crime scene, and there was testimony from Tessmer against him that showed premeditation (Simmons discussed the plot in advance and later bragged about the crime). The jury returned a guilty verdict. Even considering mitigating factors (no criminal history and his age),  the jury recommended a death sentence, which the trial court imposed.

Simmons moved for the trial court to set aside the conviction and sentence, citing, in part, ineffective assistance of counsel. His age, and thus impulsiveness, along with a troubled background, were brought up as issues that Simmons claimed should have been raised at the sentencing phase. The trial court rejected the motion, and Simmons appealed.

The case worked its way up the court system, with the courts continuing to uphold the death sentence. However, in light of a 2002 U.S. Supreme Court ruling, in Atkins v. Virginia, that overturned the death penalty for the intellectually disabled, Simmons filed a new petition for state post-conviction relief. The Supreme Court of Missouri concluded that "a national consensus has developed against the execution of juvenile offenders" and held that such punishment now violates the Eighth Amendment's prohibition of cruel and unusual punishment. They sentenced Simmons to life imprisonment without parole.

The State of Missouri appealed the decision to the U.S. Supreme Court, which agreed to hear the case.

Opinion of the Court 
This case was argued on October 13, 2004. The appeal challenged the constitutionality of capital punishment for persons who were juveniles when their crimes were committed, citing the Eighth Amendment protection against cruel and unusual punishment.

A 1988 Supreme Court decision, Thompson v. Oklahoma, barred execution of offenders under the age of 16. In 1989, another case, Stanford v. Kentucky, upheld the possibility of capital punishment for offenders who were 16 or 17 years old when they committed the capital offense. The same day in 1989, the Supreme Court ruled in Penry v. Lynaugh that it was permissible to execute the intellectually disabled. However, in 2002, that decision was overruled in Atkins v. Virginia, where the Court held that evolving standards of decency had made the execution of the mentally retarded "cruel and unusual punishment" and thus unconstitutional.

Under the "evolving standards of decency" test, the Court held that it was cruel and unusual punishment to execute a person who was under the age of 18 at the time of the murder.  Writing for the majority, Justice Kennedy cited a body of sociological and scientific research that found that juveniles have a lack of maturity and sense of responsibility compared to adults. Adolescents were found to be over-represented statistically in virtually every category of reckless behavior. The Court noted that in recognition of the comparative immaturity and irresponsibility of juveniles, almost every state prohibited those under age 18 from voting, serving on juries, or marrying without parental consent. The studies also found that juveniles are more vulnerable to negative influences and outside pressures, including peer pressure. They have less control, or experience with control, over their own environment. They also lack the freedom that adults have, to escape a criminogenic setting.

In support of the "national consensus" position, the Court noted that states were reducing the frequency by which they applied capital punishment to juvenile offenders. At the time of the decision, 20 states had the juvenile death penalty on the books, but only six states had executed prisoners since 1989 for crimes committed as juveniles. Only three states had done so since 1994: Oklahoma, Texas, and Virginia. Furthermore, five of the states that allowed the juvenile death penalty at the time of the 1989 case had since abolished it.

The Court also looked to practices in other countries to support the holding. Between 1990 and the time of the case, the court said, "only seven countries other than the United States ha[d] executed juvenile offenders ... : Iran, Pakistan, Saudi Arabia, Yemen, Nigeria, the Democratic Republic of the Congo, and China." Justice Kennedy noted that since 1990, each of those countries had either abolished the death penalty for juveniles or made public disavowal of the practice, and that the United States stood alone in allowing execution of juvenile offenders; however, Saudi Arabia, Iran, Pakistan, and Yemen continued to execute juvenile offenders after 2005, with Iran executing 3 juvenile offenders in January 2018 alone. Executions of juveniles have also been reported in South Sudan. The Court also noted that only the United States and Somalia had not ratified Article 37 of the United Nations Convention on the Rights of the Child (September 2, 1990), which expressly prohibits capital punishment for crimes committed by juveniles. (Somalia went on to ratify it in 2015.)

Dissents 

Justice Scalia wrote a dissent joined by Chief Justice Rehnquist and Justice Thomas. Justice O'Connor also wrote a dissenting opinion. The dissents put into question whether a "national consensus" had formed among the state laws, citing the fact that at the time of the ruling, only 18 of the 38 states allowing the death penalty (47%) prohibited the execution of juveniles.

However, the primary objection of the Court's two originalists, Justices Scalia and Thomas, was whether such a consensus was relevant. Justice Scalia argued that the appropriate question was not whether there was presently a consensus against the execution of juveniles, but rather whether the execution of such defendants was considered cruel and unusual at the point at which the Bill of Rights was ratified.

In addition, Justice Scalia also objected in general to the Court's willingness to take guidance from foreign law in interpreting the Constitution; his dissent questioned not only the relevance of foreign law but also claimed the Court would "invoke alien law when it agrees with one's own thinking, and ignore it otherwise", noting that in the case of abortion, U.S. laws are less restrictive than the international norm.

Scalia also attacked the majority opinion as being fundamentally antidemocratic. His dissent cited a passage from The Federalist Papers in arguing that the role of the judiciary in the constitutional scheme is to interpret the law as formulated in democratically selected legislatures. He argued that the Court exists to rule on what the law says, not what it should say, and that it is for the legislature, acting in the manner prescribed in Article V of the Constitution to offer amendments to the Constitution in light of the evolving standard of decency, not for the Court to arbitrarily make de facto amendments. He challenged the right of unelected lawyers to discern moral values and to impose them on the people in the name of flexible readings of the constitutional text.

Implications

Impact on other death row prisoners 

In addition to striking down the death sentence of Christopher Simmons, the Supreme Court's decision in Roper v. Simmons also canceled the death sentences of 72 others for crimes they committed while younger than age 18. The greatest effects were in Texas, where 29 juvenile offenders were awaiting execution, and in Alabama, where 13 on death row had been sentenced as juveniles. No other state had more than five such offenders on death row.
 
Prior to the Roper decision, there had been 22 executions since 1976 of individuals who were juveniles at the time they committed the crime; 13 were in Texas.

Constitutional jurisprudence 

The majority ruling highlighted several controversies in the field of constitutional jurisprudence. The first is the use of the concept of an evolving "national consensus" to allow for the re-interpretation of previous rulings.  In this case, the evolving consensus was influenced by behavioral and other research studies, such as those presented to the court in an amicus brief by the American Psychological Association.  What constitutes evidence for such a consensus—and from where the judicial branch derives its authority to determine it and implement it into law, a function constitutionally vested in the legislative branch, especially in the case of capital punishment—is unclear at this point. In Roper v. Simmons the majority cited the abolishment of juvenile capital punishment in 30 states (18 of the 38 allowing capital punishment) as evidence of such a consensus. In Atkins v. Virginia, it was the "consensus" of the 30 states (18 of 38 allowing capital punishment) that had banned execution of the mildly retarded.

Another controversy is the role of foreign laws and norms in the interpretation of U.S. law. In 2004 Representative Tom Feeney (FL-R) introduced a non-binding resolution instructing the judiciary to ignore foreign precedent when making their rulings: "This resolution advises the courts they are no longer engaging in 'good behavior' in the meaning of the Constitution and they may subject themselves to the ultimate remedy, which would be impeachment."

Beltway sniper case 

The implications of this ruling were immediately felt in the State of Virginia, where Lee Boyd Malvo became no longer eligible for the death penalty for his role in the Beltway sniper attacks that terrorized the Washington, D.C. area in October 2002.  At the time of the attacks, Malvo was 17 years old. Malvo had already been spared the death penalty in his first trial for the murder of FBI employee Linda Franklin in Falls Church, Virginia, and had pleaded guilty in another case in Spotsylvania County; however, he had yet to face trial in Prince William County, Virginia, as well as in Washington, D.C., Washington state, Texas, Maryland, Louisiana, California, Arizona and Alabama. In light of this Supreme Court decision, the prosecutors in Prince William County decided not to pursue the charges against Malvo. At the outset of the Beltway sniper prosecutions, the primary reason for extraditing the two suspects from Maryland, where they were arrested, to Virginia, was the difference in how the two states deal with the death penalty. While the death penalty was allowed in Maryland, it was only applied to persons who were adults at the time of their crimes, whereas Virginia had also allowed the death penalty for offenders who had been juveniles when their crimes were committed.

Further developments 

In Ex parte Adams, the Supreme Court of Alabama remanded the death sentence of a juvenile for a rehearing in the lower court in light of the Roper decision, which was released while the Adams case was pending appeal. Justice Tom Parker, who had participated in the prosecution of the case, recused himself. He published an op-ed in The Birmingham News to criticize his non-recused colleagues for their decision. Justice Parker wrote that "State supreme courts may decline to follow bad U.S. Supreme Court precedents because those decisions bind only the parties to the particular case".

The State sought review in the U.S. Supreme Court, raising a single issue, "Whether this Court should reconsider its decision in Roper v. Simmons, 543 U.S. 551 (2005)". The Supreme Court denied certiorari (i.e., declined to take the case for review) on June 19, 2006, without a published dissent.

See also 

 Kennedy v. Louisiana (2008)
 Graham v. Florida (2010)
 Miller v. Alabama (2012)
 Capital punishment for juveniles in the United States

Notes

References 

 Lane, Charles (March 2, 2005) 5-4 Supreme Court Abolishes Juvenile Executions The Washington Post, p. A01.
 Boorstein, Michelle (October 27, 2004) Malvo Gets Two More Life Terms, Teen Sniper Enters Plea In Spotsylvania Attacks The Washington Post, p. B01.
 .
 .

External links
 
 Death Penalty Information Center – Juvenile Offenders Who Were On Death Row

United States Supreme Court decisions that overrule a prior Supreme Court decision
United States children's rights case law
United States Supreme Court cases
Cruel and Unusual Punishment Clause and death penalty case law
Capital punishment in Missouri
2005 in United States case law
Capital punishment for juveniles
United States Supreme Court cases of the Rehnquist Court